Liam Doyle (born 1 July 1992) is a Manx former professional footballer who played as a defender. Doyle is currently the Director of Soccer Operations for MLS Next Pro club Huntsville City FC.

Liam was formally drafted by D.C. United in the 2016 MLS SuperDraft.

Liam is also a United States Green Card holder.

Career

Youth and college
Doyle played soccer at Cincinnati State Technical and Community College in 2012 and 2013, before transferring to Ohio State University in 2014, where he stayed for two years.

Professional
Doyle has played for St Marys on his native Isle of Man. The team competes in the Isle of Man Football League. On 19 January 2016, Doyle was selected 67th overall in the 2016 MLS SuperDraft by DC United. However, after trialling with the club he was not signed.

Doyle signed with United Soccer League side Harrisburg City Islanders in April 2016 and made his debut as a late substitute on 2 April 2016 against Charlotte Independence.

Doyle moved to USL side Swope Park Rangers on 6 December 2016.

Doyle was signed by USL side Nashville SC on 14 December 2017.

Following a mutual termination of his contract with Nashville, Doyle subsequently joined USL side Memphis 901.

On 18 September 2020, Doyle moved to USL Championship side San Antonio FC for the remainder of the season.

On 13 September 2021, Doyle joined Indy Eleven on loan for the reminder of the season.

Following his release from San Antonio, Doyle signed with USL Championship side LA Galaxy II on 3 March 2022.

Doyle announced his retirement from professional football on 18 November 2022.

International
Doyle was called up to the Isle of Man national team for the first time in 2010.

Post-playing career
On 14 December 2022, it was announced that Doyle had been named Director of Soccer Operations at MLS Next Pro side Huntsville City FC ahead of their inaugural season.

References

External links

Ohio State bio

1992 births
Living people
Manx footballers
Cincinnati State Surge men's soccer players
Ohio State Buckeyes men's soccer players
Penn FC players
Sporting Kansas City II players
Nashville SC (2018–19) players
Memphis 901 FC players
San Antonio FC players
Indy Eleven players
LA Galaxy II players
Association football defenders
USL Championship players
D.C. United draft picks
Expatriate soccer players in the United States
Isle of Man international footballers
British expatriate footballers
British expatriate sportspeople in the United States
Nashville SC non-playing staff